Leucaspidini is a tribe of armored scale insects.

Genera
Anamaspis generally a junior synonym for Leucaspis,
except Anamaspis rosae Kozarzhevskaya & Vlainic, 1981 junior synonym for Aulacaspis rosae (Bouché, 1833)
Anamefiorinia
Anotaspis
Chimania
Faureaspis
Galeraspis
Gomezmenoraspis
Leucaspis
Lopholeucaspis
Maniaspis
Mongrovaspis Bodenheimer, 1951
Namaquea
Neoleucaspis
Paraleucaspis
Pseudoleucaspis
Radionaspis
Salicicola
Suturaspis

References

	

Aspidiotinae
Hemiptera tribes